The 1983 Darlington by-election was a parliamentary by-election held  on 24 March 1983 for the British House of Commons constituency of Darlington in County Durham.

The seat had become vacant when the constituency's Labour Member of Parliament (MP), Edward Fletcher had died on 13 February 1983, a few days before his 72nd birthday.  He had held the seat since the 1964 general election.

The result of the contest was a victory for the Labour candidate, Oswald O'Brien, who won with a majority of 2,412 over the Conservative Party candidate Michael Fallon. O'Brien only held the seat for three months, however, as it fell to Fallon at the general election in June 1983. 

The by-election campaign is regarded by many former SDP members, including Bill Rodgers, as having been one that destroyed the SDP's momentum. Tony Cook, a local television celebrity, was the candidate and appeared to know very little about public issues and made a poor impression. At one point the SDP had been leading in the polls, but in part due to Cook's poor performance as a candidate, highlighted by the coverage from journalist Vincent Hanna, they finished third.

Votes

See also
Darlington (UK Parliament constituency)
Darlington
1923 Darlington by-election
1926 Darlington by-election
List of United Kingdom by-elections

References

Darlington
Darlington by-election
Darlington by-election
Darlington by-election
Politics of Darlington
20th century in County Durham